Jean Coulomb (7 November 1904 – 26 February 1999) was a French geophysicist and mathematician, and one of the early members of the Bourbaki group of mathematicians.

Biography 

From April 1935 to 1937, he was a member of the Bourbaki group of mathematicians.

He was a professor in the Faculty of Sciences of Paris from 1941 to 1972, and director of the Institut de Physique du Globe de Paris from 1941 to 1959.

He was director-general of CNRS, the French National Centre for Scientific Research from 1957 to 1962, president of CNES from 1962 to 1967, and president of the Bureau des Longitudes from 1967 to 1969.

Coulomb was the President of the Société astronomique de France (SAF), the French astronomical society, from 1958-1960.

From 1967 to 1971, he was also president of the International Union of Geodesy and Geophysics (IUGG), and from 1972 to 1974 of the International Council for Science (ICSU).

In 1960, he was elected to the French Academy of Sciences, and was its president from 1976 to 1977.

His work was in the fields of seismology (theory of surface waves), geomagnetism, and meteorology (atmospheric electricity and the physics of clouds).

Awards and distinctions 
1956 — Prix Charles Lagrange
1961 — Prix Jules Janssen
1971 — Prix des Trois Physiciens
1991 — Grand Cross of the Légion d'Honneur
Grand Croix of the Ordre du Mérite
Officer of the Ordre du Mérite Saharien

References 

1904 births
1999 deaths
Nicolas Bourbaki
French geophysicists
Members of the French Academy of Sciences
Grand Croix of the Légion d'honneur
20th-century French mathematicians
Presidents of the International Union of Geodesy and Geophysics